Castle of Illusion Starring Mickey Mouse is a 2.5D platform game developed by Sega Studios Australia and published by Sega. The game is a remake of the original 1990 Sega Genesis/Sega Mega Drive video game of the same name, which was the first title in the Illusion series of Mickey Mouse video games. The game was released on PlayStation 3, Xbox 360, and Microsoft Windows in September 2013, and later for iOS, Windows Phone, Android, and Mac OS X.

Gameplay

Following the same style of gameplay as the original Mega Drive/Genesis title, presented in high-definition 3D graphics, the game is largely played as a side-scrolling platformer like its predecessor, although some sections allow Mickey Mouse to move in multiple directions, such as puzzle segments. Mickey's main offensive ability is his bounce attack, which he can use to bounce on enemies and reach higher areas. He can also collect projectiles which he can throw at long distance enemies. Levels are re-envisioned versions of the original game's levels now separated into three acts, featuring new layouts, puzzles and enemies, as well as enhanced boss fights. The castle itself, which was merely a transition in the original game, can now be fully explored, with new areas opened up by collecting numerous gems littered around each level. Throughout the game, players can find playing cards and chilli peppers that can be used to unlock various outfits for Mickey.

Plot
As in the 1990 original, the game casts players in the role of Mickey Mouse who must fight his way through the Castle of Illusion to rescue Minnie Mouse from the evil witch Mizrabel who wants to steal her youth and beauty.

Obstacles include enchanted forests, rebellious toys and mazes of living books.

Development and release
The Castle of Illusion remake was teased by Sega in April 2013 and was announced later that month. The game was developed by Sega Studios Australia, their last game before the studio was shut down, under the supervision of the original game's director, Emiko Yamamoto. The game features a remastered soundtrack arranged by Grant Kirkhope, as well as an option to listen to the original soundtrack composed by Shigenori Kamiya. The game also features full voice acting for Mickey, as well as narration by Richard McGonagle. Both Mickey's and the Narrator's scripts were written by Dean Wilkinson. From September 2016 until March 2017, the game was delisted from the Steam, Xbox Live, and PlayStation Network stores.

Players who pre-ordered the game on PlayStation Network were able to download the original Genesis game, as well as a theme and custom avatars.

Reception

The iOS version received "favorable" reviews, while the PC and console versions received "average" reviews, according to the review aggregation website Metacritic. IGN praised the Xbox 360 version's presentation while critiquing its slippery controls and a short length. Joystiq called the PlayStation 3 version "both a great remake and a showcase for the key elements that make a great platformer". GameSpot praised the Xbox 360 version's fun platforming while lamenting unskippable cutscenes. Official Xbox Magazine called the same console version "a fun update to yesteryear's classic, but also a solid platformer in its own right".

References

External links

2013 video games
Disney video games
IOS games
MacOS games
Mickey Mouse video games
Platform games
PlayStation 3 games
PlayStation Network games
Sega video games
Video game remakes
Video games scored by Grant Kirkhope
Video games set in castles
Video games developed in Australia
Windows games
Video games about witchcraft
Xbox 360 Live Arcade games
Feral Interactive games
Single-player video games